Revazi Barabadze (born 4 October 1988) is a Georgian former professional footballer who played as a forward.

References

External links
 

1988 births
Living people
Footballers from Georgia (country)
Association football forwards
Georgia (country) international footballers
FC Dnipro players
FC Metalurgi Rustavi players
FC Carl Zeiss Jena players
FC Anzhi Makhachkala players
Ethnikos Achna FC players
Ukrainian Premier League players
Russian Premier League players
Expatriate footballers from Georgia (country)
Expatriate sportspeople from Georgia (country) in Russia
Expatriate footballers in Russia
Expatriate sportspeople from Georgia (country) in Ukraine
Expatriate footballers in Ukraine
Expatriate sportspeople from Georgia (country) in Germany
Expatriate footballers in Germany
Expatriate sportspeople from Georgia (country) in Cyprus
Expatriate footballers in Cyprus